Kenneth Webster may refer to:

 Kenneth G. T. Webster (1871–1942), Canadian-born American literary scholar
 Kenneth Athol Webster (1906–1967), art collector and dealer